The National Executive Board of the Boy Scouts of America governs the Boy Scouts of America organization. One source reports that there were 72 members of the board in 2001.

The board is led by the national chair, a volunteer elected by the National Council.  Board members include regular elected members, regional presidents, and up to five appointed youth members. The Chief Scout Executive is the board secretary and non-voting member.  The National Executive Board has a number of standing committees that correspond to the professional staff organization of the National Council.

Establishment in statute 
The statute authorizing the federal charter (36 USC 309)  to the BSA provides that "An executive board composed of citizens of the United States is the governing body of the corporation. The number, qualifications, and term of office of members of the board are as provided in the bylaws. A vacancy on the board shall be filled by a majority vote of the remaining members of the board." The Executive Board is also required to hold annual meetings and to submit annual reports to the US Congress.

Membership 
Bylaws provide that membership will include:
 Up to 64 regular members, elected annually at annual National Council meetings.
 Regional presidents;  currently there are four BSA regions: —Western, Central, Southern and Northeast.
 5 ex officio voting members: The chairman of the Advisory Council, the President of the National Eagle Scout Association, the Chairman of the Order of the Arrow Committee, a designated representative of the Board of the National Boy Scouts of America Foundation, and the Chairman of Learning for Life, the immediate past chair
 Up to 5 youth members, appointed by the National Chair

Current and former members  
Current notable members of the National Executive Board include former Ernst & Young CEO James Turley, AT&T CEO Randall Stephenson, and former Secretary of State Rex W. Tillerson.

Former members of the NEB include former presidential nominee Mitt Romney and late LDS Church President Thomas S. Monson.

Executive committee 
Per the by-laws, the executive committee is:
 the Chair, currently Jim Turley
 the immediate past chair, currently Randall Stephenson
 the executive vice-president and the vice-presidents.
 the regional presidents,  Brian Williams (Central), Wesley J. Smith (Western), Eric Schultz  (North-East), Thomas R. Yarboro (Southern)
 the  International Commissioner,  Jim Turley
 the National Commissioner, Scott Sorrels
 the treasurer,  Joseph P. Landy
 the assistant treasurers, R. Thomas Buffenbarger
 the chairman of the Advisory Council, R. Michael Daniel
 the Chief Scout Executive, Roger Mosby

Annual meetings 
The board is required to hold annual meetings. The annual meeting is held at a different location every May. These meetings include the election of the new National Executive Board, and when applicable installation of new National Chair, National Commissioner, and Chief Scout Executive.

During this meeting, the National Council presents all National and Regional level awards, including the Silver Buffalo, and Silver Antelope.

References 

Boy Scouts of America
Boy Scouts of America